Richard Ryan Phillips (born February 7, 1974) is a former professional American football player who played linebacker for five seasons for the New York Giants and the Indianapolis Colts. He was a third round draft selection in the 1997 NFL Draft, the 68th overall pick. At the time, one of his hobbies was skydiving.

Phillips played high school football in the Seattle area at Auburn Senior High School in Auburn, Washington, and college football for the Vandals of the University of Idaho in Moscow. He was the Big Sky Conference defensive player of the year and an All-American (Division I-AA) as a junior in 1995 at defensive end. Phillips moved to outside linebacker as a senior in 1996.

References

External links
 

1974 births
Living people
Sportspeople from Renton, Washington
Players of American football from Washington (state)
American football linebackers
Idaho Vandals football players
New York Giants players
Indianapolis Colts players